

The Great Camps of the Adirondack Mountains refers to the grandiose family compounds of cabins that were built in the latter half of the nineteenth century on lakes in the Adirondacks such as Spitfire Lake and Rainbow Lake. The camps were summer homes for the wealthy, where they could relax, host or attend parties, and enjoy the wilderness. In time, however, this was accomplished without leaving the comforts of civilization behind; some great camps even contained a bowling alley or movie theatre.

"Consciously sited in remote locations, characterized by the use of logs and indigenous stone, shingled roofs with broad overhangs and porches, and simply-proportioned window and door openings, these building complexes are among our most original examples of vernacular architecture."

The style of the Great Camps was influenced by the British Arts and Crafts Movement and the related American Craftsman style as well as by Swiss chalet design. William West Durant, an early developer of the camps, was familiar with all three styles and adapted them to local materials and the skills of the craftsmen.

History
The Adirondack region was one of the last areas of the northeastern United States to be explored by settlers; the headwaters of the Hudson River near Lake Tear of the Clouds on the slopes of Mount Marcy were not discovered until more than fifty years after the discovery of the headwaters of the Columbia River in the Canadian Rockies. Although a few sportsmen had shown some interest earlier, the publication of William H. H. Murray's Adventures in the Wilderness; Or Camp-Life in the Adirondacks in 1869 started a flood of tourists to the area, leading to a rash of hotel building and the development of stage coach lines. Thomas Clark Durant, who had helped to build the Union Pacific railroad, acquired a large tract of central Adirondack land and built the Adirondack Railway from fashionable Saratoga Springs to North Creek, New York. By 1875 there were more than two hundred hotels in the Adirondacks, some of them with several hundred rooms; the most famous was Paul Smith's Hotel.

The early Great Camps started life as simple tent camps, often on land initially leased from hotel owners, as hotel guests sought a more authentic wilderness experience. The tent camps evolved into tent platforms or lean-tos and then into compounds of rustic cabins. Even in the early stages, some of these camps became quite elaborate. In 1883 one of the first families on Upper St. Regis Lake, that of the wealthy merchant Anson Phelps Stokes, would arrive in a "special parlour horse car direct from 42nd street to Ausable for $100."  One party consisted of ten family members and an equal number of servants, "three horses, two dogs, one carriage, five large boxes of tents, three cases of wine, two packages of stovepipe, two stoves, one bale of china, one iron pot, four washstands, one barrel of hardware, four bundles of poles, seventeen cots and seventeen mattresses, four canvas packages, one buckboard, [...], twenty-five trunks, thirteen small boxes, one boat, one hamper", all of which was then transferred to wagons for the 36 mile ride to Paul Smiths, and thence by boat to their island campsite.

As the region's hotels became more civilized and elaborate (Paul Smith's started without indoor plumbing), so too did the camps. But the use of rustic, native materials and craftsmen remained, as did a tendency to use separate buildings for separate functions, from dining to sleeping cabins, bowling alleys to dance pavilions, all connected by covered walkways as features of a distinctive Adirondack Architecture.

The largest and most luxurious camps were generally built on large landholdings; Adirondack land was cheap and the buyers were extraordinarily wealthy. Many of them were Jewish families excluded from the traditional Adirondack resorts. For example, the rules of the Lake Placid Club specifically excluded anyone "against whom there is any reasonable physical, moral, social or race objection ... This invariable rule is rigidly enforced: it is found impracticable to make exceptions to Jews or others excluded...." Wealthy Jews such as Otto Kahn, Alfred Lewisohn, Daniel Guggenheim, and Evelyn Lehman Ehrich and Harriet Lehman (daughters of one of the founders of brokerage firm Lehman Brothers) purchased land and constructed Great Camps when they found it impossible to join the established Adirondack clubs.

The Great Camp tradition has analogues in the western United States, especially in the Rocky Mountains. Closely tied to the dude ranch tradition, elaborate private lodges and cabins owned by groups of wealthy Easterners were constructed in the wilderness. Often families originated from New York or Chicago and traveled by train to spend long periods in summer in the high country. Some lodges in the West were built by railroad interests, who were able to pick the best land while surveying potential railroad routes.

Preservation

The term "great camp" was used as early as 1916, although it was not until the late twentieth century, when preservation of these historic properties became a widely shared concern, that the term was given academic currency. By 1921, in A History of the Adirondacks, Alfred Lee Donaldson was writing that "Among Adirondack terms calling for exact definition is the word 'camp.'... If you chance to know a millionaire, you may be housed in a cobblestone castle, tread on Persian rugs, bathe in a marble tub, and retire by electric light--and still your host may call his mountain home a 'camp.'"

The realization that the camps were vulnerable came when, in 1975, Syracuse University announced plans to sell Sagamore Camp, which had been a gift to the university from Margaret Emerson. As Craig Gilborn, Director of the Adirondack Museum put it "If a college or university, regarded as the best societal steward of cultural properties, could now treat them as part of an investment portfolio, then the camps were in real jeopardy."  Particularly worrisome was the fact that, under the Forever Wild provision of the New York State Constitution, if the camp were acquired by the state as part of the Forest Preserve, the buildings would have to be destroyed.

Sagamore was listed on the National Register of Historic Places in 1976. In the early 1980s staff of the Adirondack Museum recognized the Great Camps as a historic resource of the region and undertook some documentation. Gilborn, on learning that Sagamore Camp was threatened with demolition, contacted Paul Malo at Syracuse University, knowing the professor to be an architectural historian interested in regional landmarks. Professor Malo induced the Preservation League of New York State to become active in saving Camp Sagamore. Professor Malo represented the organization in negotiating with the State of New York to spare the Sagamore buildings. As president of the organization he subsequently led the Preservation League's campaign to amend the New York State Constitution in order to save the service complex buildings at Camp Sagamore, adding them to the landmark complex. The Preservation League also conducted an extensive survey of the region, identifying more than thirty properties that might be considered "Great Camps of the Adirondacks."

At the same time, Harvey Kaiser, a vice-president of Syracuse University, interviewed owners and others familiar with these historic properties, photographing the buildings in their settings. He wrote and illustrated an important 1982 book, "Great Camps of the Adirondacks," which popularized the term, stimulating wider public concern for preservation of these landmark buildings.

Shortly after demolition of the historic buildings at Sagamore Camp was averted, nearby Camp Uncas was similarly threatened. The same couple who saved Sagamore Camp, Howard Kirschenbaum and Barbara Glaser, negotiated with the State of New York, acquiring these buildings to save them.

Howard Kirschenbaum then founded Adirondack Architectural Heritage, a regional preservation organization that undertook a long, eventually successful campaign to save the historic buildings of the Santanoni Preserve.

In July 1986, a multiple property submission for registration of 10 great camps on the National Register was completed. It was certified in September 1986 by the State Historic Preservation Officer. The 10 camps covered were: 
Camp Eagle Island
Camp Pine Knot
Camp Topridge
Camp Uncas
Camp Wild Air
Echo Camp
Moss Ledge
Prospect Point Camp
Sagamore Lodge (a boundary increase to the Sagamore Camp), and
Santanoni Preserve
These were subsequently added to the National Register in 1986 and 1987. Flat Rock Camp was added in 2006.

Both Sagamore Camp and Santanoni Preserve have since become National Historic Landmarks, in 2000, as have Camp Uncas, Camp Pine Knot at Raquette Lake and Girl Scout Camp Eagle Island on Upper Saranac Lake, in 2004.

Since the early preservation crises, appreciation of the Great Camps of the Adirondacks has increased, so that fewer seem to be in jeopardy at this time (2006), though the properties are large and costly to maintain.

See also
Adirondack Architecture
Joe Bryere
Carnegie Camp North Point
Knollwood Club
Pine Tree Point
White Pine Camp

Notes

Other references

Donaldson, Alfred Lee, A History of the Adirondacks. New York: The Century Co., 1921.
 Engel, Robert; Howard Kirschenbaum; Paul Malo. Santanoni: From Japanese Temple to Life at an Adirondack Great Camp. Keesville, NY: Adirondack Architectural Heritage, 2000.
 Gilborn, Craig.  Adirondack Camps:  Homes Away from Home, 1850-1950. Blue Mountain Lake, NY:  Adirondack Museum;  Syracuse:  Syracuse University Press, 2000.
 Gilborn, Craig. Durant: Fortunes and Woodland Camps of a Family in the Adirondacks. Utica, NY: North Country Books, 1981.
 Hooker, Mildred Phelps Stokes, Camp Chronicles, Blue Mountain Lake, NY: Adirondack Museum, 1964. .
 Kaiser, Harvey.  Great Camps of the Adirondacks. Boston:  David R. Godine, 1982. Google preview
 Kirschenbaum, Howard. Story of Sagamore. Utica, NY: North Country Books, 2001.
 Morgan, Bret. Rustic: Country Houses, Rural Dwellings, Wooded Retreats. New York, NY: Rizzoli International Publications, 2009.
 Schneider, Paul. The Adirondacks: a History of America's First Wilderness. New York: Henry Holt & Company, 1997.

External links
  Haynes, Wesley.  Adirondack Great Camp Theme Study
 Camp Santanoni
 Adirondack Architectural Heritage
  Great Camp Santanoni-Town of Newcomb
 
  New York Times, "Preserving Adirondacks Great Camps", June 11, 1992
 New York Times, "Out-Twigging the Neighbors; In the Adirondacks, Great Camps Are Sprouting Again"
PBS "Adirondack Great Camps"

 
Residential buildings in New York (state)
Rustic architecture in New York (state)